Leobordea platycarpa is a common annual plant in the drier parts of the African continent found in open ground, roadsides, cultivated ground and other disturbed places or in short grassland on sand.

Distribution
Native
Palearctic: 
Macaronesia: Cape Verde
Northern Africa: Algeria, Egypt, Libya, Morocco
Afrotropic:
Northeast Tropical Africa: Chad, Djibouti, Ethiopia, Sudan
East Tropical Africa: Kenya, Tanzania, Uganda
West-Central Tropical Africa: Central African Republic, Zaire
South Tropical Africa: Angola, Zimbabwe
Southern Africa: Botswana, Namibia, South Africa - Cape Province, Free State, Transvaal
Western Indian Ocean: Mauritius
Arabian Peninsula: Oman, Qatar, Saudi Arabia, Yemen
Western Asia: Iran, Israel, Syria
Indomalaya:
Indian Subcontinent: Pakistan

References

External links

Crotalarieae